Eupithecia cocoata is a moth in the family Geometridae. It is found in North America, with records from Maryland, Iowa and Washington.

The length of the forewings is 11 mm. The ground colour of the forewings is grey with some faint, brown, wavy, thin lines. The ground color of the hindwings is grey with brown, wavy, thicker lines. Adults have been recorded on wing in May and July.

References

Moths described in 1908
cocoata
Moths of North America